Gregory King is a Canadian sound designer.

Career
Gregory King was born in 1966 in Montreal, Quebec. King's first professional job in sound design came in 1986, when he was hired by seasoned film sound editors Nolan Roberts and Alban Streeter. The beginning of his career largely focused on sound design within the television industry and playing in bands as a musician in Toronto. During the late 1980s he worked in sound design at Filmhouse, a studio now known as Deluxe Lab, and in 1991 formed the feature film sound editorial firm Sound Dogs with partner Nelson Ferreira.

In 1994 he moved to Los Angeles, forming Sound Dogs US in 1995 with fellow sound designers Robert Grieve and Robert Nokes and launching a large online sound effects archive in May 1997 called Sounddogs.com.  The Insider was nominated for an Oscar for Best Sound in 1999. King's work on the film involved a great amount of artistic freedom, as he worked with director Michael Mann. Other directors King has worked with include Peter Berg,

In the late 2000s King formed a sound design firm called The Dawgs Sound Design, which later became King SoundWorks. As of 2001, he worked as a supervising sound designer.

Awards and nominations 
Greg King was nominated for two Golden Reel Awards in a row for The Road to El Dorado (2000) and The Insider (2001).

References

External links
Homepage

1966 births
Living people
Anglophone Quebec people
Canadian sound designers
People from Montreal